Phil Economidis is an Australian Rugby league coach currently coaching Red Star Rugby League Club in the Serbian Rugby League. He is perhaps best remembered for his stint as coach of the now defunct Gold Coast Chargers in the old Australian Rugby League.

Coaching career
Economidis guided the Gold Coast to finals glory in 1997, they beat the Illawarra Steelers 25-14 in front of just 8,197 dedicated fans at Parramatta Stadium, believed to be the lowest ever finals series attendance for the ARL/NRL.

Economidis also assisted in "Coach Talk", inside the sixth edition of Shamrock's Rugby League book.

Throughout his ARL career with the Gold Coast Chargers, he guided the club to 20 victories from 69 starts, a percentage of 29%, the highest of any Gold Coast coach pre Gold Coast Titans.

Economidis moustache was a favourite of many league fans in the late 1990s.

References

1953 births
Living people
Australian rugby league coaches
Gold Coast Chargers coaches
Red Star Rugby League Club coaches
People from Biloela